George Brock may refer to:
George F. Brock (1872–1914), Medal of Honor recipient 
George Brock (footballer) (1919–1941), Australian rules footballer
George Brock (athlete) (1888–1956), Canadian track and field athlete
George Brock (journalist) (born 1951), head of the department of journalism at City University London
Big George Brock (1932–2020), American blues musician from St Louis, Missouri